Stade Michel-Bendichou is a sports stadium in Colomiers, France. It is the home ground of the rugby union team US Colomiers of the Rugby Pro D2. It has a capacity of 11,430. It takes its name from Michel Bendichou, a former president of the club.

References

Mich
Rugby union stadiums in France